Main page: List of Canadian plants by family

Families:
A | B | C | D | E | F | G | H | I J K | L | M | N | O | P Q | R | S | T | U V W | X Y Z

Balsaminaceae 

 Impatiens aurella — pale-yellow jewelweed
 Impatiens capensis — spotted jewelweed
 Impatiens ecalcarata — spurless touch-me-not
 Impatiens noli-tangere — western jewelweed
 Impatiens pallida — pale jewelweed

Bartramiaceae 

 Anacolia menziesii
 Bartramia halleriana
 Bartramia ithyphylla
 Bartramia pomiformis
 Bartramia stricta
 Conostomum tetragonum
 Philonotis capillaris
 Philonotis fontana — philonotis moss
 Philonotis marchica
 Philonotis yezoana
 Plagiopus oederiana

Berberidaceae 

 Achlys californica — California deer's-foot
 Achlys triphylla — three-leaf deer's-foot
 Caulophyllum giganteum — giant blue cohosh
 Caulophyllum thalictroides — blue cohosh
 Jeffersonia diphylla — twinleaf
 Mahonia aquifolium — Piper's Oregon-grape
 Mahonia nervosa — longleaf Oregon-grape
 Mahonia repens — creeping Oregon-grape
 Podophyllum peltatum — mayapple

Betulaceae 

 Alnus incana — speckled alder
 Alnus rubra — red alder
 Alnus serrulata — brookside alder
 Alnus viridis — green alder
 Betula alleghaniensis — yellow birch
 Betula borealis — northern birch
 Betula lenta — sweet birch
 Betula minor — dwarf white birch
 Betula nana — dwarf swamp birch
 Betula neoalaskana — Alaska paper birch
 Betula occidentalis — spring birch
 Betula papyrifera — paper birch
 Betula populifolia — grey birch
 Betula pumila — swamp birch
 Betula x caerulea
 Betula x dutillyi
 Betula x eastwoodiae
 Betula x hornei
 Betula x neoborealis
 Betula x purpusii
 Betula x raymundii
 Betula x sandbergii — Sandberg's birch
 Betula x sargentii
 Betula x uliginosa
 Betula x utahensis
 Betula x winteri
 Carpinus caroliniana — American hornbeam
 Corylus americana — American hazelnut
 Corylus cornuta — beaked hazelnut
 Ostrya virginiana — eastern hop-hornbeam

Bignoniaceae 

 Campsis radicans — trumpet-creeper

Blasiaceae 

 Blasia pusilla

Blechnaceae 

 Blechnum spicant — deer fern
 Lorinseria areolata — netted chainfern
 Woodwardia fimbriata — giant chainfern
 Woodwardia virginica — Virginia chainfern

Boraginaceae 

 Amsinckia intermedia — Rancher's fiddleneck
 Amsinckia lycopsoides — bugloss fiddleneck
 Amsinckia menziesii — smallflower fiddleneck
 Amsinckia retrorsa — rough fiddleneck
 Amsinckia spectabilis — seaside fiddleneck
 Amsinckia tessellata — tessellate fiddleneck
 Cryptantha affinis — slender cat's-eye
 Cryptantha ambigua — obscure cat's-eye
 Cryptantha celosioides — cockscomb cat's-eye
 Cryptantha fendleri — Fendler's cat's-eye
 Cryptantha flaccida — weakstem cat's-eye
 Cryptantha kelseyana — Kelsey's cat's-eye
 Cryptantha minima — little cat's-eye
 Cryptantha torreyana — Torrey's cat's-eye
 Cryptantha watsonii — Watson's cat's-eye
 Cynoglossum virginianum — northern wild comfrey
 Eritrichium nanum — arctic forget-me-not
 Eritrichium splendens — showy forget-me-not
 Hackelia ciliata — Okanogan stickseed
 Hackelia deflexa — northern stickseed
 Hackelia diffusa — spreading stickseed
 Hackelia floribunda — Davis Mountain stickseed
 Hackelia micrantha — blue stickseed
 Hackelia virginiana — Virginia stickseed
 Heliotropium curassavicum — seaside heliotrope
 Lappula occidentalis — flatspine sheepburr
 Lithospermum canescens — hoary puccoon
 Lithospermum caroliniense — golden puccoon
 Lithospermum incisum — narrow-leaved puccoon
 Lithospermum latifolium — American gromwell
 Lithospermum ruderale — western gromwell
 Mertensia drummondii — Drummond's bluebells
 Mertensia lanceolata — prairie bluebells
 Mertensia longiflora — longflower bluebells
 Mertensia maritima — sea bluebells
 Mertensia paniculata — tall bluebells
 Mertensia virginica — Virginia bluebells
 Myosotis asiatica — Asian forget-me-not
 Myosotis laxa — small forget-me-not
 Myosotis macrosperma — largeseed forget-me-not
 Myosotis verna — spring forget-me-not
 Onosmodium molle — soft-hairy false gromwell
 Pectocarya penicillata — shortleaf combseed
 Plagiobothrys figuratus — rough popcorn-flower
 Plagiobothrys scouleri — meadow popcorn-flower
 Plagiobothrys tenellus — Pacific popcorn-flower

Brachytheciaceae 

 Brachythecium acuminatum
 Brachythecium acutum
 Brachythecium albicans
 Brachythecium biventrosum
 Brachythecium calcareum
 Brachythecium campestre
 Brachythecium collinum
 Brachythecium digastrum
 Brachythecium erythrorrhizon
 Brachythecium frigidum
 Brachythecium glaciale
 Brachythecium groenlandicum
 Brachythecium holzingeri
 Brachythecium hylotapetum
 Brachythecium leibergii
 Brachythecium mildeanum
 Brachythecium nelsonii
 Brachythecium oedipodium
 Brachythecium oxycladon
 Brachythecium plumosum
 Brachythecium populeum — matted feather moss
 Brachythecium reflexum — cedar moss
 Brachythecium rivulare — waterside feather moss
 Brachythecium rotaeanum — Rota's feather moss
 Brachythecium rutabulum
 Brachythecium salebrosum
 Brachythecium starkei
 Brachythecium trachypodium
 Brachythecium turgidum
 Brachythecium velutinum
 Bryhnia graminicolor
 Bryhnia hultenii
 Bryhnia novae-angliae — New England bryhnia moss
 Bryoandersonia illecebra
 Cirriphyllum cirrosum
 Cirriphyllum piliferum
 Eurhynchium hians
 Eurhynchium oreganum — Oregon beaked moss
 Eurhynchium praelongum
 Eurhynchium pulchellum
 Homalothecium aeneum
 Homalothecium arenarium
 Homalothecium fulgescens
 Homalothecium nevadense
 Homalothecium nuttallii
 Homalothecium pinnatifidum
 Homalothecium sericeum
 Isothecium alopecuroides
 Isothecium cristatum
 Isothecium myosuroides
 Platyhypnidium riparioides
 Pseudoscleropodium purum
 Scleropodium cespitans
 Scleropodium obtusifolium
 Scleropodium touretii
 Steerecleus serrulatus — steerecleus moss
 Tomentypnum falcifolium
 Tomentypnum nitens
 Trachybryum megaptilum

Brassicaceae 

 Alyssum obovatum — American alyssum
 Aphragmus eschscholtzianus — Aleutian-cress
 Arabidopsis salsuginea — saltwater cress
 Arabis alpina — alpine rockcress
 Arabis arenicola — arctic rockcress
 Arabis boivinii — Boivin's rockcress
 Arabis calderi — Calder's rockcress
 Arabis canadensis — sicklepod
 Arabis codyi — Cody's rockcress
 Arabis drummondii — Drummond's rockcress
 Arabis glabra — tower-mustard
 Arabis hirsuta — western hairy rockcress
 Arabis holboellii — Holböll's rockcress
 Arabis laevigata — smooth rockcress
 Arabis lemmonii — Lemmon's rockcress
 Arabis lignifera — Owens Valley rockcress
 Arabis lyallii — Lyall's rockcress
 Arabis lyrata — lyreleaf rockcress
 Arabis microphylla — small-leaf rockcress
 Arabis murrayi — Murray's rockcress
 Arabis nuttallii — Nuttall's rockcress
 Arabis shortii — Short's rockcress
 Arabis sparsiflora — elegant rockcress
 Arabis x divaricarpa — hybrid rockcress
 Armoracia lacustris — lake-cress
 Athysanus pusillus — common sandweed
 Barbarea orthoceras — American wintercress
 Braya fernaldii — Fernald's northern rockcress
 Braya glabella — smooth rockcress
 Braya humilis — low braya
 Braya longii — Long's braya
 Braya pilosa — hairy rockcress
 Braya thorild-wulffii — Greenland rockcress
 Cakile edentula — American sea-rocket
 Cardamine angulata — seaside bittercress
 Cardamine bellidifolia — alpine bittercress
 Cardamine breweri — Brewer's bittercress
 Cardamine bulbosa — bulbous bittercress
 Cardamine concatenata — cutleaf toothwort
 Cardamine digitata — Richardson's bittercress
 Cardamine diphylla — two-leaf toothwort
 Cardamine douglassii — purple cress
 Cardamine lyallii — Lyall's bittercress
 Cardamine maxima — large toothwort
 Cardamine microphylla — littleleaf bittercress
 Cardamine nuttallii — Nuttall's toothwort
 Cardamine occidentalis — western bittercress
 Cardamine oligosperma — few-seed bittercress
 Cardamine parviflora — smallflower bittercress
 Cardamine pensylvanica — Pennsylvania bittercress
 Cardamine pratensis — cuckoo-flower
 Cardamine x anomala
 Cochlearia groenlandica — Greenland cochlearia
 Cochlearia officinalis — scurvy-grass
 Cochlearia tridactylites — limestone scruvy-grass
 Descurainia incana — mountain tansy-mustard
 Descurainia pinnata — pinnate tansy-mustard
 Descurainia sophioides — northern tansy-mustard
 Draba albertina — slender whitlow-grass
 Draba alpina — alpine whitlow-grass
 Draba arabisans — rock whitlow-grass
 Draba arctogena — fell-field whitlow-grass
 Draba aurea — golden draba
 Draba borealis — boreal whitlow-grass
 Draba cana — hoary draba
 Draba cinerea — greyleaf whitlow-grass
 Draba corymbosa — flat-top whitlow-grass
 Draba crassifolia — snowbed whitlow-grass
 Draba densifolia — denseleaf whitlow-grass
 Draba fladnizensis — white arctic whitlow-grass
 Draba glabella — rock whitlow-grass
 Draba hyperborea — North Pacific whitlow-grass
 Draba incana — hoary whitlow-grass
 Draba incerta — Yellowstone whitlow-grass
 Draba juvenilis — longstalk whitlow-grass
 Draba kananaskis — tundra whitlow-grass
 Draba kluanei — Kluane Park whitlow-grass
 Draba lactea — milky whitlow-grass
 Draba laurentiana — St. Lawrence whitlow-grass
 Draba lonchocarpa — lancepod whitlow-grass
 Draba macounii — Macoun's whitlow-grass
 Draba macrocarpa — Chukchi Peninsula whitlow-grass
 Draba murrayi — Murray's whitlow-grass
 Draba nemorosa — wood whitlow-grass
 Draba nivalis — yellow arctic whitlow-grass
 Draba norvegica — Norwegian whitlow-grass
 Draba oblongata — Canadian arctic whitlow-grass
 Draba ogilviensis — Ogilvie Range whitlow-grass
 Draba oligosperma — few-seed whitlow-grass
 Draba palanderiana — Palander's whitlow-grass
 Draba pauciflora — Adam's whitlow-grass
 Draba paysonii — Payson's whitlow-grass
 Draba porsildii — Porsild's whitlow-grass
 Draba praealta — tall whitlow-grass
 Draba pycnosperma — dense whitlow-grass
 Draba reptans — Carolina whitlow-grass
 Draba ruaxes — Rainier's whitlow-grass
 Draba scotteri — Scotter's whitlow-grass
 Draba stenoloba — Alaska whitlow-grass
 Draba stenopetala — Anadyr whitlow-grass
 Draba subcapitata — Ellesmere Island whitlow-grass
 Draba ventosa — Wind River whitlow-grass
 Draba yukonensis — Yukon whitlow-grass
 Erysimum angustatum — Dawson wallflower
 Erysimum arenicola — Cascade wallflower
 Erysimum asperum — prairie-rocket wallflower
 Erysimum capitatum — western wallflower
 Erysimum cheiranthoides — wormseed wallflower
 Erysimum inconspicuum — smallflower prairie wallflower
 Erysimum redowskii (syn. E. pallasii) — Pallas' wallflower
 Eutrema edwardsii — Edwards' eutrema
 Halimolobos mollis — soft rockcress
 Halimolobos virgata — virgate halimolobos
 Halimolobos whitedii — Whited's rockcress
 Hutchinsia procumbens — prostrate hymenolobus
 Idahoa scapigera — scapose scalepod
 Lepidium densiflorum — denseflower pepper-grass
 Lepidium oxycarpum — sharp-pod pepper-grass
 Lepidium ramosissimum — branched pepper-grass
 Lepidium virginicum — poor-man's pepper-grass
 Lesquerella alpina — alpine bladderpod
 Lesquerella arctica — arctic bladderpod
 Lesquerella arenosa — Great Plains bladderpod
 Lesquerella calderi — Calder's bladderpod
 Lesquerella douglasii — Douglas' bladderpod
 Lesquerella ludoviciana — silver bladderpod
 Parrya arctica — arctic false-wallflower
 Parrya nudicaulis — naked-stemmed wallflower
 Physaria didymocarpa — common twinpod
 Rorippa barbareifolia — hoary yellowcress
 Rorippa calycina — persistent-sepal yellowcress
 Rorippa crystallina — Asiatic cress
 Rorippa curvipes — Rocky Mountain yellowcress
 Rorippa curvisiliqua — curvepod yellowcress
 Rorippa palustris — bog yellowcress
 Rorippa sinuata — spreading yellowcress
 Rorippa tenerrima — Modoc County yellowcress
 Rorippa truncata — wild yellowcress
 Schoenocrambe linifolia — Salmon River plains-mustard
 Smelowskia borealis — northern smelowskia
 Smelowskia calycina — alpine smelowskia
 Smelowskia ovalis — alpine smelowskia
 Subularia aquatica — water awlwort
 Thelypodium laciniatum — cutleaf thelypody
 Thlaspi arcticum — arctic pennycress
 Thysanocarpus curvipes — fringepod

 Bruchiaceae 

 Bruchia flexuosa Trematodon ambiguus Trematodon boasii Trematodon longicollis Trematodon montanus Bryaceae 

 Anomobryum filiforme Bryum algovicum Bryum alpinum Bryum amblyodon Bryum archangelicum Bryum arcticum Bryum argenteum — silvery bryum
 Bryum blindii Bryum caespiticium Bryum calobryoides Bryum calophyllum Bryum canariense Bryum capillare Bryum cyclophyllum Bryum dichotomum — bryum moss
 Bryum erythroloma Bryum flaccidum Bryum gemmascens Bryum gemmiparum Bryum klinggraeffii Bryum knowltonii Bryum lisae Bryum lonchocaulon Bryum longisetum Bryum marratii Bryum meesioides Bryum miniatum Bryum muehlenbeckii Bryum nitidulum Bryum oblongum Bryum pallens Bryum pallescens Bryum pseudotriquetrum Bryum purpurascens Bryum ruderale Bryum salinum Bryum schleicheri Bryum stirtonii Bryum subapiculatum Bryum subneodamense Bryum tenuisetum Bryum teres Bryum turbinatum Bryum uliginosum Bryum violaceum Bryum warneum Bryum weigelii Bryum wrightii Epipterygium tozeri Leptobryum pyriforme Mielichhoferia macrocarpa Mielichhoferia mielichhoferiana Plagiobryum demissum Plagiobryum zieri Pohlia andalusica Pohlia annotina Pohlia atropurpurea Pohlia bolanderi Pohlia brevinervis Pohlia bulbifera Pohlia camptotrachela Pohlia cardotii Pohlia columbica Pohlia cruda Pohlia crudoides Pohlia drummondii Pohlia elongata Pohlia erecta Pohlia filum Pohlia lescuriana Pohlia longibracteata Pohlia longicolla Pohlia ludwigii Pohlia melanodon Pohlia nutans Pohlia obtusifolia Pohlia pacifica Pohlia proligera Pohlia sphagnicola Pohlia tundrae Pohlia vexans Pohlia wahlenbergii Rhodobryum ontariense Rhodobryum roseum — rose moss
 Roellia roellii Buxbaumiaceae 

 Buxbaumia aphylla — bug-on-a-stick
 Buxbaumia minakatae — hump-backed elves
 Buxbaumia piperi Buxbaumia viridis Diphyscium foliosum'' — powder gun moss

Canada,family,B